Norwood Scarp is a distinct, 18 km long and 1525 m high cliff in the East of Palmer Land on the Antarctic Peninsula. It is on the east flank of the Weyerhaeuser Glacier.

The United States Antarctic Service photographed it on September 28, 1940, from the air. The Falkland Islands Dependencies Survey did the same on August 14, 1947, and conducted a rough survey in December 1958 and November 1960. The UK Antarctic Place-Names Committee named it after the English mathematician Richard Norwood (1590–1675), who promoted great circle sailing.

External links 
  
 Norwood Scarp on geographic.org 

Cliffs of Palmer Land